LeechModem was a BBS file transfer protocol client. LeechModem was compatible with protocols like XMODEM (and YMODEM), but it would mischievously NAK the last packet and then abort the file transfer. The user had successfully downloaded the file, but the BBS would mistakenly not count the aborted file transfer against the user's download quota. The user would need to know and input the filesize before the transfer so the client would know when to abort.

Leech-modem was designed by Sam Brown. Leech ZMODEM was suggested by Sam Brown but written by a long lost friend in Atlanta, GA. Leech ZMODEM was a LeechModem variant that was compatible with the faster ZMODEM streaming file-transfer protocol.
 
Subsequent versions of Leech ZMODEM were authored by Sam Brown. LeechModem was used successfully for 2-3 years by a small group of people centered in the 408 area code and 203 area code. It was not until the LeechModem software was leaked that it was discovered and counter-measures were built into BBS software.  Emulex/2 was the first BBS software to support Anti-LeechModem technology. This was because Sam Brown wrote Emulex/2 BBS software as well. A common method was rounding the file size to the nearest kilobyte, causing the user to be unaware of the exact file size, rendering Leechmodem unusable.

See also
Leech (computing)

BBS file transfer protocols